Aviram Mizrahi (born January 20, 1962) is an Israeli sprint canoer who competed in the mid-1980s. He was eliminated in the semifinals of the K-1 500 m event at the 1984 Summer Olympics in Los Angeles.

External links
 Sports-Reference.com profile

1962 births
Canoeists at the 1984 Summer Olympics
Israeli male canoeists
Living people
Olympic canoeists of Israel